Amazon is a 1997 American short documentary film directed by Kieth Merrill. It was nominated for an Academy Award for Best Documentary Short.

Summary
The film features ethnobiologist Mark Plotkin, who discusses the role of rainforest conservation and the benefits of investigating it further in the interest of medical and scientific knowledge.

References

External links

Rotten Tomatoes
The entire film on Tubi

1997 films
1997 documentary films
1997 independent films
1990s short documentary films
1990s English-language films
American independent films
American short documentary films
Films directed by Kieth Merrill
Documentary films about nature
Films set in the Amazon
MacGillivray Freeman Films films
IMAX documentary films
1990s American films